The Gravity Games was a multi-sport competition originating in Providence, Rhode Island that was broken down into Winter (only held in 2000) and Summer (held from 1999 to 2006) adaptations. The competition featured a variety of extreme sports such as aggressive inline skating, skateboarding, freestyle motocross, BMX freestyle and snowboarding.

The Gravity Games were jointly owned through a strategic partnership between Primedia, Octagon and NBC Sports.

The summer Gravity Games were last held in Perth in Australia in December 2006.

Locations

Summer
1999 – Providence, Rhode Island
2000 – Providence, Rhode Island
2001 – Providence, Rhode Island
2002 – Cleveland, Ohio
2003 – Cleveland, Ohio
2004 – Cleveland, Ohio
2005 – Woodward & Philadelphia, Pennsylvania
2006 – Perth, Western Australia, Australia

Winter
2000 – Mammoth Mountain, California

Events

Summer
Skateboarding
 Vert
 Street 
 Downhill

BMX
 Vert
 Street
 Dirt

Freestyle Moto-X

Street Luge

Surfing

Wakeboarding

Winter

Snowboarding
 Park
 Mountain 
 Superpipe
 Big Air
 Boarder X

Snowmobile
 Racing
 Freestyle

Skiing
 Superpipe
 Park
 Skier X
 Big Air
 Mountain

History
1999 Gravity Games I (Providence, Rhode Island)
 Jamie Bestwick took the gold medal in BMX Vert. In the same event, after Simon Tabron crashed during his run, he went back on his bike and landed a 900 (skateboarding).
 Biker Sherlock took the silver in Downhill Skateboarding while Lee Dansie claimed the gold. 
 In Freestyle Motocross, Travis Pastrana takes home the gold. During his two runs, Pastrana landed tricks such as a Cliffhanger, a Lazy Boy and a Rodeo Air.
Dave Mirra won the gold medal in BMX Park.

2000 Gravity Games II (Providence, Rhode Island)
 Carey Hart crashed while attempting to land the first backflip on a dirt bike but did not sustain any injuries.
 Brian Deegan won the gold medal in Freestyle Motocross.

2000 Winter Gravity Games I (Mammoth Mountain, California)
 Despite a heavy snowfall, the gold medal in Snowboarding Superpipe went to Ross Powers. Mammoth Mountain native Tommy Czeschin took the silver. In Women’s Superpipe, Shannon Dunn won the gold.
 Shaun Palmer took home the gold medal in Boarder X. Later he switched to skis and won gold in Skier X.

2001 Gravity Games III (Providence, Rhode Island)
 This was the last year of  Gravity Games competition in Rhode Island.

2002 Gravity Games IV (Cleveland, Ohio)
 In Freestyle Motocross, both Travis Pastrana and Mike Metzger pulled off backflips during their runs.

2003 Gravity Games V (Cleveland, Ohio)
 Nate Adams won the gold medal in freestyle motocross. In the same event, Travis Pastrana crashed while attempting to do a Seatgrab Backflip.
2004 Gravity Games VI (Cleveland, Ohio)

2005 Gravity Games VII (Woodward & Philadelphia, Pennsylvania)
 Ryan Guettler won BMX Dirt with one of the highest scores ever in dirt, a 97.00. Luke Parslow came in second, and Joey Marks came in third.
 In BMX Vert, Kevin Robinson (BMX rider) tried to land a double flair but bailed upon landing. He would successfully land the trick one year later at X Games XII in Los Angeles.

See also

 Dew Tour
 X Games
 Gravity Games Bike: Street Vert Dirt

References

External links
Gravity Games website

Multi-sport events in the United States
Sports in Cleveland
Sports in Pennsylvania
Centre County, Pennsylvania
Sports in Philadelphia
Sport in Perth, Western Australia
Sports in Providence, Rhode Island
Multi-sport events in Australia
1999 establishments in Rhode Island
Recurring sporting events established in 1999
Freestyle motocross